A list of Finnish writers:

A

Marja-Sisko Aalto
Uma Aaltonen
Aapeli
Kari Aartoma
Umayya Abu-Hanna
Aino Ackté
Gösta Ågren
Juhani Aho
Aleksanteri Ahola-Valo
Johan Jacob Ahrenberg
Risto Ahti
Outi Alanne
Santeri Alkio
Marianne Alopaeus
Claes Andersson
Tuuve Aro
Adolf Ivar Arwidsson

B

Tapani Bagge
Veijo Baltzar
Maria Berg
Kersti Bergroth
Hassan Blasim
Caj Bremer

C

Walter de Camp
Minna Canth
Kristina Carlson
Bo Carpelan
Fredrik Cygnaeus

D

Erik Dahlberg

E

Albert Eerola
Adelaïde Ehrnrooth
Michel Ekman
Kari Enqvist
Pekka Ervast

F

Monika Fagerholm
Henrik Florinus
Tua Forsström
Peter Franzén
Eino Friberg
Hanna Frosterus-Segerstråle

G

Sami Garam
Kaarina Goldberg
Carl Axel Gottlund
Karl Jacob Gummerus
Hans Aslak Guttorm

H

Hilja Haapala
Paavo Haavikko
Lucina Hagman
Simo Halinen
Jouko Halmekoski
Yrjö Halonen
Helvi Hämäläinen
Virpi Hämeen-Anttila
Eero Hämeenniemi
Eino Hanski
Anna-Leena Härkönen
Saima Harmaja
Satu Hassi
Pirjo Hassinen
Vilho Helanen
Linda Helenius
Elina Hirvonen
Pentti Holappa
Anselm Hollo
Johanna Holmström
Kari Hotakainen
Lars Huldén
Hannele Huovi
Veikko Huovinen
Juha Hurme
Antti Hyry

I

Jouni Inkala

Risto Isomäki
Emmi Itäranta

J

Olli Jalonen
Pedar Jalvi
Lars Jansson
Tove Jansson
Arvid Järnefelt
Artturi Järviluoma
Eeva Joenpelto
Matti Yrjänä Joensuu
Maria Jotuni
Daniel Juslenius
Helvi Juvonen

K

Sirpa Kähkönen
Markus Kajo
Hilda Käkikoski
Aino Kallas
Urho Karhumäki
Elina Karjalainen
Jussi Pekka Kasurinen
Daniel Katz
Kerttu Kauniskangas
Anssi Kela
Usko Kemppi
Katja Kettu
Ilmari Kianto
Jyrki Kiiskinen
Eeva Kilpi
Volter Kilpi
Marko Kitti
Markku Kivinen
Hanna Kokko
Yrjö Kokko
Lauri Kokkonen
Vilho Koljonen
Riku Korhonen
Jorma Korpela
Jukka Koskelainen
Julius Krohn
Leena Krohn
Heli Kruger
Kirsi Kunnas
Matti Kurikka
Janne Kuusi
Stephen Kuusisto
Tuomas Kyrö

L

Jarkko Laine
Sinikka Laine
Seppo Lampela
Leena Lander
Eeles Landström
Martti Larni
Joel Lehtonen
Lasse Lehtinen
Torsti Lehtinen
Tuija Lehtinen
Joel Lehtonen
Eino Leino
Santeri Levas
Tommi Liimatta
Rosa Liksom
Aleko Lilius
Lauri Linna
Väinö Linna
Johannes Linnankoski
Katri Lipson
Herbert Lomas
Elias Lönnrot
Sami Lopakka
Kiba Lumberg
Reko Lundán
Ulla-Lena Lundberg
Hannu Luntiala
Heikki Luoma

M

Hannu Mäkelä
Aino Malmberg
Eeva-Liisa Manner
Juha Mannerkorpi
Otto Manninen
Auli Mantila
Jarkko Martikainen
David McDuff
Arto Melleri
Veijo Meri
Aila Meriluoto
Väinö Merivirta
Marja-Leena Mikkola
Timo K. Mukka

N

Arne Nevanlinna
August Nordenskiöld
Hj. Nortamo
Gustaf von Numers
M. A. Numminen
Heikki Nurmio
Mikaela Nyman
Carita Nyström

O

Jorma Ojaharju
Sofi Oksanen
Aki Ollikainen
Hagar Olsson
Kreetta Onkeli

P

Arto Paasilinna
Erno Paasilinna
Reino Paasilinna
Kalle Päätalo
Kai Pahlman
Pietari Päivärinta
Teuvo Pakkala
Raoul Palmgren
Heikki Palmu
Kirsti Paltto
Timo Parvela
Samuli Paulaharju
Toivo Pekkanen
Jyrki Pellinen
Juhani Peltonen
Eila Pennanen
Arvi Pohjanpää
Mike Pohjola
Ursula Pohjolan-Pirhonen
Mirjam Polkunen
Kira Poutanen
Riikka Pulkkinen
Salomo Pulkkinen

R

Erkki Räikkönen
Mirkka Rekola
Gustaf Renvall
Mikko Rimminen
Susanne Ringell
Fredrika Runeberg
Johan Ludvig Runeberg
Laura Ruohonen
Juha Ruusuvuori
Kaisu-Mirjami Rydberg

S

Pentti Saarikoski
Asko Sahlberg
Pirkko Saisio
Hannu Salama
Martta Salmela-Järvinen
Arto Salminen
Arvo Salo
Kyösti Salokorpi
Pentti Sammallahti
Mauri Sariola
Jalmari Sauli
Roman Schatz
Raija Siekkinen
Frans Emil Sillanpää
Kirsti Simonsuuri
Helena Sinervo
Johanna Sinisalo
Lassi Sinkkonen
Yrjö Sirola
Anja Snellman
J. V. Snellman
Edith Södergran
Yrjö Soini
Lauri Soininen
Johnny Spunky
Katariina Souri
Pajtim Statovci
Eira Stenberg
Nils-Börje Stormbom
Alpo Suhonen
Lars Sund
Klaus Suomela
Aatto Suppanen

T

Marton Taiga
Maila Talvio
Jari Tervo
Ilpo Tiihonen
Eeva Tikka
Henrik Tikkanen
Märta Tikkanen
Jarkko Tontti
Jouko Turkka
Sirkka Turkka
Heikki Turunen
Antti Tuuri
Jukka Tyrkkö

U

Algot Untola
Kaari Utrio
Meri Utrio

V

Hannu Väisänen
Ilkka Vartiovaara
Kosti Vehanen
Lauri Viita
Uljas Vikström
Tapio Vilpponen
Juha Vuorinen

W

Sara Wacklin
Edvin Wahlstén
Mika Waltari
Thomas Warburton
Helena Westermarck
Kjell Westö
Sigurd Wettenhovi-Aspa

Y

Yrjö Sakari Yrjö-Koskinen

Z

Konni Zilliacus

See also
List of Finnish women writers

Bibliography

 
Writers
Finnish